State Route 24 (SR 24) is a heavily traveled east–west state highway in the U.S. state of California that serves the eastern side of the San Francisco Bay Area. A freeway throughout its entire length, it runs from the Interstate 580/Interstate 980 interchange (just east of the MacArthur Maze) in Oakland, and through the Caldecott Tunnel under the Berkeley Hills, to the Interstate 680 junction in Walnut Creek. It lies in Alameda County, where it is highly urban, and Contra Costa County, where it passes through wooded hillsides and suburbs. SR 24 is a major connection between the San Francisco–Oakland Bay Bridge/MacArthur Maze complex and the inland cities of the East Bay.

Route description
SR 24 begins at the four-level stack interchange with Interstate 580 and Interstate 980 in Oakland; this interchange is located on top of Grove Shafter Park. SR 24 initially heads north before turning east near the Berkeley city limits. Route 24 rises from near sea level in downtown Oakland past its interchange with State Route 13, which is a freeway south of SR 24 (upgraded August 1999) and a surface street north of SR 24. After this, SR 24 crosses the Contra Costa County county line through the four-bore Caldecott Tunnel and offers some attractive views of the hilly terrain through which it passes. Some protection of the views comes from the highway's designation as a California Scenic Highway.

On the other side of the tunnel, SR 24 travels through unincorporated Contra Costa County before entering Orinda. SR 24 crosses the Mokelumne Aqueduct soon after entering the city of Lafayette. SR 24 terminates at the intersection with Interstate 680 just inside the city limits of Walnut Creek.

The  of the Bay Area Rapid Transit (BART) system runs in the freeway's center median, excepting the vicinity of the Caldecott Tunnel and the approach to the interchange with Interstate 680.

SR 24 is part of the California Freeway and Expressway System, and is part of the National Highway System, a network of highways that are considered essential to the country's economy, defense, and mobility by the Federal Highway Administration. SR 24 is eligible to be included in the State Scenic Highway System; however, Caltrans has only designated it as a scenic highway between the eastern end of the Caldecott Tunnel and I-680, meaning that it is a substantial section of highway passing through a "memorable landscape" with no "visual intrusions", where the potential designation has gained popular favor with the community. SR 24 is designated as both the Grove Shafter Freeway, after streets the route travels along (Grove Street was later renamed Martin Luther King Jr. Way), and the William Byron Rumford Freeway, honoring the first African American elected to a state public office in Northern California, from the Caldecott Tunnel to the I-580 interchange segment of the MacArthur Maze, continuing henceforth as I-980 to the terminus with I-880.

History
Highway 24 was designated in 1932 in conjunction with the ongoing construction of the Broadway Low Level Tunnel (renamed the Caldecott Tunnel in 1960) which opened in 1937, connecting with the new Eastshore Highway and the approaches to the new Bay Bridge by way of Tunnel Road and Ashby Avenue through Berkeley west of the Berkeley Hills, and routed along Mount Diablo Boulevard through Contra Costa County east of the hills.  Before either the bridge or the tunnel were completed, Highway 24 was provisionally routed starting from downtown Oakland at the major intersection of San Pablo and Broadway, which was also the terminal point of US 40 and State Highway 17.  From this point, Highway 24 proceeded northward along Broadway to College Avenue, then along College to Claremont Avenue, up Claremont to Tunnel Road, then up into the Berkeley Hills on Tunnel Road to the old Intercounty Tunnel (also called the Kennedy Tunnel), through the tunnel into Contra Costa County.

Highway 24 remained along Ashby Avenue until completion of the Grove-Shafter Freeway in the late 1960s. This new freeway, which ran from the Caldecott Tunnel through downtown Oakland to the MacArthur and Nimitz Freeways, was designated Route 24 and Ashby was re-designated Route 13.

Route 24 used to extend much further east. The section of Interstate 680 between the current terminus of SR 24 and State Route 242 was dual-signed I-680 and SR 24 until ca. 1987; State Route 242 which runs primarily in Concord was signed as Route 24 until the same time. Older maps show routes for 24 which continue along State Route 4 from the current intersection of 242 to the Antioch Bridge, continuing along the river road to Sacramento, currently State Route 160, then continuing north to Woodland, Marysville, Oroville, along the North Fork of the Feather River to a junction with State Route 89 (this segment is currently State Route 70), where it continued dual-numbered with 89 through Quincy.  Highway 24 split from 89 near Graeagle, and continued east through Portola east until its terminus at U.S. Route 395. Parts of the same route were also sometimes designated as State Route 84. 
 
At least one published map from the 1960s incorrectly showed Route 24 extending eastward from Interstate 680 in Walnut Creek to Route 4 in Pittsburg that followed the Ygnacio Valley Road-Kirker Pass Road-Railroad Avenue corridor, presumably as a future extension that never materialized.  A 1970 State Highway Map shows this corridor as a future Route 24 bypass.

A 1956 version of Thomas Brothers maps shows Mt. Diablo Blvd. where present day Northgate Road is and labeled as Route 24, winding and climbing the mountain.

Exit list
Mileage is measured from SR 24's original western terminus, now part of Interstate 980.

See also

References

External links

California @ AARoads - State Route 24
Caltrans: Route 24 highway conditions
California Highways: SR 24
Alternate routes considered for Route 24 in Oakland

024
024
024
State Route 024
State Route 024
Transportation in Oakland, California
Lafayette, California
Orinda, California
Walnut Creek, California